is a 2005 Japanese film directed by Akira Ogata.

Awards
27th Yokohama Film Festival
 Best Screenplay
 Best Actress - Yūko Tanaka
 Best Supporting Actor - Ittoku Kishibe
 2nd Best Film

References

External links
 

2005 films
Films directed by Akira Ogata
2000s Japanese films